Hans Henriksen Ussing (30 December 1911 – 22 December 2000) was a Danish scientist, best known for having invented the Ussing chamber.

In the early 1950s Ussing was the first to describe the mechanism by which ions are actively transported across frog skin.

He studied biology and geography at the University of Copenhagen. In 1943 he received his master's degree (with honors).

In 1970 he was awarded the Amory Prize of the American Academy of Arts and Sciences.

References

External links 
 The Royal Society: Hans Henriksen Ussing (Biography) (PDF; 1,1 MB)
 www.frontiersin.org
 Hans Ussing (physiologicinstruments.com)

1911 births
2000 deaths
Danish scientists
20th-century Danish inventors
Foreign Members of the Royal Society
Foreign associates of the National Academy of Sciences